Berya (Bere) is a rural locality (a selo), and one of five settlements in Sylansky Rural Okrug of Churapchinsky District in the Sakha Republic, Russia, in addition to Usun-Kyuyol, the administrative center of the Rural Okrug, Dyarla, Ogusur and Ulakhan-Kyuyol. Its population as of the 2010 Census was 60; down from 66 recorded in the 2002 Census.

References

Sources
Official website of the Sakha Republic. Registry of the Administrative-Territorial Divisions of the Sakha Republic. Churapchinsky District. 

Rural localities in Churapchinsky District